Netherlands – Poland relations is the official relationship between the Kingdom of the Netherlands and Republic of Poland. Both nations are members of the European Union, NATO and OECD.

History
Two countries have a long-standing relationship dated back from the Middle Ages. Their strong tie began at 16th century when Dutch Mennonites began to settle in Poland in the mid-1500s to flee from persecutions across Europe. They settled mainly in the Vistula delta, and later also in Masovia and in the Berdyczów county in Volhynia. Many of Mennonites' technique, cultures, contributions are still remaining in Poland today as an example of historical tolerance of the Polish–Lithuanian Commonwealth.

During the Dutch Golden Age, goods were transported between the Netherlands and Poland freely, with Dutch traders gained dominant positions in trade with the Poles, to the expansion of arts and architecture. Over years later however, relationship between two countries would have been severed by the Partitions of Poland, and for most of next 123 years, there had been no official tie between two. Nonetheless, Polish immigrants fleeing persecution in Russia, Austria and Prussia got supported in the Netherlands and sometimes settled there. In the late 18th century, some Dutch Mennonites settled near the cities of Lwów and Gródek Jagielloński in the Austrian Partition of Poland.

Modern ties

After the World War I and the rebirth of Poland, two countries once again established relations. However, there were little to no formal connections until the World War II when Nazi Germany launched invasions on both nations. Being victims of Nazi brutality, Poles and Dutch shared common frontier fighting against the Nazis. The 1st Polish Armoured Division joined as part of the Allies led by the United Kingdom participated in Dutch liberation war against Nazis, and was praised for its valiant efforts on its fight to free both Poland and the Netherlands.

However, after the World War II, the Netherlands and Poland was completely cut off for the second time, with Poland fell to the communists controlled by the Soviet Union at the Eastern Bloc; while the Netherlands were part of Western Bloc of the Cold War. Nonetheless, Dutchmen supported Solidarity movement to topple the communists in Poland, which was a complete success and overthrowing communist rule in Central and Eastern Europe together.

Trade, people and cooperation
The Netherlands is now Poland's no.1 investor among European Union, in total €30,3 billion in 2015. There are about 2,500 enterprises operating in the Polish market with Dutch shareholding that are employing over 120,000 people in Poland.

Polish diaspora also exist in the Netherlands, and is perceived well by the Dutch locals. Polish immigrants form the sixth largest immigration group to the Netherlands.

Two countries maintain close tie in other links, with both being members of the European Union, NATO and OECD.

The Netherlands and Poland are the scheduled hosts of the 2022 FIVB Volleyball Women's World Championship.

Resident diplomatic missions
 Netherlands has an embassy in Warsaw.
 Poland has an embassy in The Hague.

See also
 Foreign relations of the Netherlands
 Foreign relations of Poland
 Poles in the Netherlands
 The Dutch in Poland
 Poland in the European Union

References

 
Bilateral relations of the Netherlands
Poland
Netherlands